Right Place, Wrong Time is a 1976 album by blues singer and guitarist Otis Rush.  Although regarded as one of his finest recordings, the album was not issued until five years after it was recorded.

Background

The music on this album was originally recorded in San Francisco in 1971 for Capitol Records, who declined to release it at the time.  It was originally released on the independent Bullfrog label after Rush bought the tapes.  In 1986 the rights were acquired by Hightone.

Eugene Chadbourne of Allmusic compares Capitol's decision not to release the album to a decision to turn down The Doors on the grounds that Jim Morrison had "no charisma", and says that "[o]ne can imagine the tapes practically smoldering in their cases, the music is so hot".

As well as a selection of blues numbers, the album includes a cover of Tony Joe White's "Rainy Night in Georgia".

Track listing
Except where otherwise noted, tracks composed by Otis Rush

"Tore Up" (Ralph Bass, Ike Turner) - 3:17
"Right Place, Wrong Time" - 5:24
"Easy Go" - 4:41
"Three Times a Fool" - 3:11
"Rainy Night in Georgia" (Tony Joe White) - 3:55
"Natural Ball" (Albert King) - 3:30
"I Wonder Why" (Mel London) - 4:41
"Your Turn to Cry (Gil Caple, Deadric Malone) - 3:35
"Lonely Man" (Milton Campbell, Bob Lyons) - 2:50
"Take a Look Behind" - 5:40

Personnel

Performance

Fred Burton - guitar
Bob Jones - drums
John Kahn - bass
Ira Kamin - organ
Doug Kilmer - bass
Hart McNee - alto saxophone
Mark Naftalin - piano
Otis Rush - vocals, guitar
Ron Stallings - tenor saxophone
John Wilmeth - trumpet

Production
Nick Gravenites - producer
Stephen Barncard - Engineer
Amy  O'Neal - photography
Otis Rush - producer
Dick Shurman - liner notes

References

Otis Rush albums
1976 albums
Albums produced by Nick Gravenites